In Australian federal politics, the shadow cabinet is the opposition's equivalent to the federal cabinet. It comprises the most senior figures within the opposition, headed by the leader of the opposition as the counterpart to the prime minister of Australia.

The shadow cabinet is the highest level of the shadow ministry (or "opposition frontbench"), which also includes other less senior shadow ministers (equivalent to the government's "outer ministry") and shadow assistant ministers. The members of the shadow ministry are assigned one or more portfolios, usually though not necessarily corresponding to an existing ministerial portfolio within the government. They serve as the opposition's chief spokespeople on matters within their portfolio, and during parliamentary question time may direct questions at their government equivalent. If the opposition forms government, such as through winning a federal election, it is typical for members of the shadow ministry to retain the same portfolio.

The current shadow cabinet  is the Dutton shadow cabinet.

Role and functions

The role of the shadow ministry in making opposition policy has varied.

Meetings of shadow cabinet are less formal than actual cabinet meetings, typically lasting a shorter time.

History
In May 1965, the Australian Labor Party Caucus voted to establish a formal shadow ministry of 25 members. This replaced an earlier "opposition executive" consisting of 14 members.

Since 1987, the shadow ministry has had at least as many members as the ministry, and sometimes more. Shadow parliamentary secretaries (known as shadow assistant ministers since 2016) were first appointed in 1990.

Current arrangement

Salary and benefits
, ordinary shadow ministers were entitled to either a 20 or 25 percent loading on top of the base parliamentary salary. The loading depends on the number of shadow ministers. Officeholders within the opposition receive higher loadings, up to 87 percent for the leader of the opposition. Historically, ordinary shadow ministers received no additional salary compared to backbenchers but were granted an additional staffing allowance.

See also
Shadow Ministry of Peter Dutton
Leader of the Opposition in the Senate
Manager of Opposition Business in the House
Manager of Opposition Business in the Senate

References

Sources

Opposition of Australia
Australian shadow ministries
Australia